The 1961 Paris–Nice was the 19th edition of the Paris–Nice cycle race and was held from 10 March to 16 March 1961. The race started in Paris and finished in Nice. The race was won by Jacques Anquetil of the Helyett team.

General classification

References

1961
1961 in road cycling
1961 in French sport
March 1961 sports events in Europe